Sedad Subašić (born 16 February 2001) is a Bosnian professional footballer who plays as a midfielder.

Subašić started his career at Rudar Kakanj, before joining Bosnian Premier League side Željezničar in 2019. He left Željezničar in 2022.

Club career

Early career
Born in Zenica, Bosnia and Herzegovina, Subašić started playing football in 2007 at Rudar Kakanj, joining the club's first team in 2017. He would then move on to join Bosnian powerhouse Željezničar on 8 July 2019, signing a five year contract and playing for both the youth and first team of the club. He made his debut for Željezničar on 9 November 2019, in a league win against Sloboda Tuzla. Subašić scored his first goal for Željezničar in a league game against Široki Brijeg on 5 December 2021. He left Željezničar in December 2022.

International career
Subašić represented the Bosnia and Herzegovina U19 national team, getting called up to the team in 2019. He played his first game against Albania on 7 September 2019.

Career statistics

Club

References

External links
Sedad Subašić at Sofascore

2001 births
Living people
Sportspeople from Zenica
Bosnia and Herzegovina footballers
First League of the Federation of Bosnia and Herzegovina players
Premier League of Bosnia and Herzegovina players
FK Rudar Kakanj players
FK Željezničar Sarajevo players
Bosnia and Herzegovina youth international footballers
Association football midfielders